Round Mountain National Recreation Trail is a hiking trail in Roosevelt National Forest west of Loveland, Colorado.  The trail was designated a National Recreation Trail in 1981.

References

Protected areas of Larimer County, Colorado
National Recreation Trails in Colorado
Roosevelt National Forest